Halsbrücke is a municipality and village in the district of Mittelsachsen, in Saxony, Germany. It is situated just north of Freiberg, on the banks of the Freiberger Mulde river.

Geography 
Halsbrücke lies 5 km north of Freiberg on the left bank of the Freiberger Mulde river. The lowest point in the area lies at around 296 metres above sea level, and the highest at 375 metres above sea level.

Districts 
Within the Halsbrücke municipality lie the following districts:

 Conradsdorf
 Erlicht
 Falkenberg
 Haida
 Halsbrücke
 Hetzdorf
 Krummenhennersdorf
 Niederschöna
 Oberschaar
 Tuttendorf

History 
Halsbrücke was originally founded in 1349 as an estate named , belonging to the Altzella monastery in Nossen. The name referred to a ridge on the bend of the river which was said to have a "neck"-like formation (German ). The area belonged to the city of Freiberg from the 16th century onwards.

While the municipality today stretches both sides of the river, Halsbrücke was formerly divided between two administrative regions. On the left bank of the Freiberger Mulde, the areas of Hals and Neu belonged to the city of Freiberg, while Sand and Grüneberg came under the jurisdiction of Meissen.

Halsbrücke had no church of its own for most of its history, instead coming under the parish of Tuttendorf. The church of St. Lorenz am Schulberg was then constructed between 1985 and 1991, and opened in 1992. The municipality was serviced by a rail connection, namely the Freiberg-Halsbrücke line, from 1890 until the line's closure in 1995. The station still exists, unused.

Mayors
 1990–2012: Jörg Kiehne (CDU)
 since 2012: Andreas Beger

Gallery

Notable people 

 Albert I, Margrave of Meissen (1158–1195), Margrave of Meißen
 Wilhelm August Lampadius (1777–1842), metallurgical technician, chemist and agronomist, established the first European illuminated gas station in Halsbrücke in 1815
 Ferdinand Reich (1799–1882), chemist and physicist, researches on the smelting of huts, apparatus for the determination of sulfuric gases in the air

References 

Mittelsachsen